Volda is a municipality in Møre og Romsdal county, Norway. It is part of the Sunnmøre region. The administrative centre is the village of Volda. Other villages in the municipality include Dravlaus, Fyrde, Straumshamn, Leira, Bjørke, and Grodås.

The  municipality is the 132nd largest by area out of the 356 municipalities in Norway. Volda is the 106th most populous municipality in Norway with a population of 10,809.

General information

The municipality of Volden was established on 1 January 1838 (see formannskapsdistrikt law). The original municipality was the same as the parish (prestegjeld) of Volden, including the sub-parishes of Ørsta and Dalsfjord. On 1 August 1883, the sub-parish of Ørsta (population: 2,070) was separated from Volden to form a new municipality of its own. This left Volden with 3,485 residents. On 1 January 1893, the Ytrestølen farm in the Ørsta municipality (population: 13) was transferred to Volden municipality. In 1918, the name was changed from Volden to Volda. On 1 July 1924, the sub-parish of Dalsfjord (population: 960) was separated from Volda to become a municipality of its own. This left Volda with 4,715 residents.

During the 1960s, there were many municipal mergers across Norway due to the work of the Schei Committee. On 1 January 1964, the municipalities of Dalsfjord (population: 1,151) and Volda (population: 6,056) were merged back together. The new Volda municipality had 7,207 residents.

On 1 January 2020, another large municipal border adjustment took place. The neighboring municipality of Hornindal (previously in Sogn og Fjordane county) and the Bjørke and Leira areas of Ørsta were merged with Volda to make a much larger Volda Municipality (in Møre og Romsdal county).

Name
The municipality is named after the Voldsfjorden. The name is probably derived from an old word meaning "wave". Before 1918, the name was written Volden.

Coat of arms
The coat of arms was adopted in 2019 for use starting in 2020. The arms from 1987 were modified by adding two scythes on either side of the tip of a fountain pen. The scythes were taken from the old arms of the former Hornindal Municipality which joined Volda in 2020.

The old arms were granted on 19 June 1987. The arms show a white- or silver-colored tip of a fountain pen on a blue background. This is a symbol for the long history of education in Volda.

Churches
The Church of Norway has six parishes within the municipality of Volda. It is part of the Søre Sunnmøre prosti (deanery) in the Diocese of Møre.

Geography
Volda's main geographical feature is the Voldsfjorden which branches off into the Austefjorden, Kilsfjorden, and Dalsfjorden. It is also mountainous, particularly southeast of the fjords, with the Sunnmørsalpene mountains surrounding the region.

Volda is bordered by municipalities of: Vanylven Municipality to the south-west/west; Herøy and Ulstein (only by sea) to the west; Ørsta to the north and east; and Stryn and Stad, in Vestland county, to the south.

The dominant centre, both in terms of population and administration, is the village of Volda, in the northernmost part of the municipality. Other population concentrations include Mork, Ekset, Folkestad, Fyrde, Steinsvika, Lauvstad, Bjørkedal, Grodås, and Straumshamn.

Some of the mountains in Volda include Hornindalsrokken, Kvitegga, and Jakta.

Climate

Government
All municipalities in Norway, including Volda, are responsible for primary education (through 10th grade), outpatient health services, senior citizen services, unemployment and other social services, zoning, economic development, and municipal roads. The municipality is governed by a municipal council of elected representatives, which in turn elect a mayor.  The municipality falls under the Møre og Romsdal District Court and the Frostating Court of Appeal.

Municipal council
The municipal council of Volda is made up of 33 representatives that are elected to four year terms. The party breakdown of the council is as follows:

Mayor
The mayors of Volda (incomplete list):
1980–1988: Rasmus R. Aarflot (Sp)
1988–2003: Knut Bere (H)
2003–2011: Ragnhild Aarflot Kalland (Sp)
2011–2015: Arild Iversen (KrF)
2015–2019: Jørgen Amdam (Ap)
2019–present: Sølvi Dimmen (Sp)

Culture
Volda is primarily known for strong cultural heritage and academic traditions. A private library at Egset, the first rural of its kind in Norway, is said to have inspired the young Ivar Aasen in the 19th century. Martin Ulvestad, Norwegian–American author who published an English-Danish-Norwegian dictionary in 1895, (Engelsk-Dansk-Norsk Ordbog med fuldstændig Udtalebetegnelse) was born in Volda. The Norsk Landboeblad newspaper was based in Volda in the 1800s. Volda landsgymnas (established 1910) was the first Norwegian secondary school outside a major city. Among the most important institutions today is the Volda University College.

Volda University College (HVO) is one of 25 university colleges in Norway. HVO, with an enrollment of about 3,000 students, specializes in education of teachers, animators, and journalists. This has attracted or incubated several animation companies to Volda, whose work is highlighted in the annual Animation Volda Festival, which started at HVO in 2007. HVO is host of the annual Norwegian Documentary Film Festival ( DOKFILM), which started in 1997.

The national ski festival X2 is also held in Volda during April every year.

The Volda TI sports club includes an association football team, whose home field is Volda Stadion. The football squad has consistently played in the 2. divisjon to 4. divisjon leagues (tiers three to five of the Norwegian football league system) for a number of decades.

As a logical consequence of the huge influx of students, as well as a county hospital, public services are by far the most dominant sector, representing almost 50% of economic life in Volda. Industry and agriculture are also prevalent. Bjørkedalen is noted for its tradition in building wooden boats.

The Sivert Aarflot Museum is located at Ekset in Volda.  Volda and its environs are featured prominently in the film Troll Hunter (2010).

Transportation
The Ørsta–Volda Airport, Hovden, is located in neighbouring municipality of Ørsta, just north of the village of Volda. The European route E39 highway passes north through the municipality on its way to the city of Ålesund. As noted, the municipality is criss-crossed by fjords; therefore, both Lauvstad and Folkestad are linked to the population centre Volda by ferry. In February 2008, the underwater Eiksund Tunnel connected the municipalities of Ulstein, Hareid, Herøy, and Sande to Ørsta and Volda. The tunnel is the deepest undersea tunnel in the world. The Kviven Tunnel was completed in 2012, connecting Fyrde to the village of Grodås to the south on the other side of a large mountain. This tunnel led to the old Hornindal Municipality joining Volda in 2020.

Notable residents

 Martin Ulvestad (1865–1942) Norwegian-American historian and philologist
 Peter Olai Thorvik (1873–1965) a blacksmith, fisherman, banker and politician
 Inger Hagerup (1905–1985) an author, playwright and poet; lived in Volda
 Dag Frøland (1945–2010) a comedian, revue artist, singer and impersonator 
 Ottar Grepstad (born 1953) a Norwegian Nynorsk writer, lives in Volda
 Olav Rune Ekeland Bastrup (born 1956) a Norwegian writer and historian
 Ragnhild Aarflot Kalland (born 1960) a local politician, Mayor of Volda 2003-2011
 Frode Grodås (born 1964) a football goalkeeper with over 250 club caps and 50 for Norway
 Simone Eriksrud (born 1970) musician, composer and lead vocalist with D'Sound
 Asbjørn Blokkum Flø (born 1973) a Norwegian composer, musician and sound artist
 Beate S. Lech (born 1974) jazz vocalist and lead singer of Beady Belle
 Erlend Slettevoll (born 1981) a Norwegian jazz pianist
 Jon Georg Dale (born 1984), Progress Party politician and former minister 
 Ørjan Håskjold Nyland (born 1990) a football goalkeeper with over 200 club caps and 28 for Norway

Gallery

References

External links
Municipal fact sheet from Statistics Norway 
Official website 
Website about Volda 
Weather forecast for Volda

 
Municipalities of Møre og Romsdal
1838 establishments in Norway